Eburia blancaneaui is a species of beetle in the family Cerambycidae found in Belize, El Salvador, Guatemala, Honduras and Mexico.

References

blancaneaui
Beetles described in 1880